Kinh Thầy River is a river of Hải Dương Province in northeast Vietnam.

References

Rivers of Hải Dương province
Rivers of Vietnam